Velventos is a town and municipality in Kozani regional unit, West Macedonia, Greece. The 2011 census recorded 3,360 people in the village of Velventos, 3,399 in the municipal community and 3,448 in the municipal unit. The municipal unit has an area of 126.516 km2, the community 54.573 km2.

Administration
The municipality of Velventos is subdivided into the following communities (constituent villages in brackets):
Velventos (Velventos, Paliogratsano)
Agia Kyriaki
Katafygio
Polyfyto

The community of Velventos (before 1940: Velvendos) was created in 1918. It absorbed the former community Paliogratsano in 1951. The municipality of Velventos was formed in 1985 by the merger of the communities of Velventos and Agia Kyriaki. The community of Polyfyto was absorbed in 1994, and Katafygio in 1997. At the 2011 Kallikratis reform, it became part of the new municipality Servia-Velventos. In 2019 the municipality of Velventos was recreated in its pre-2011 extension.

Population

Geography

Velventos lies at the foot of the Pierian Mountains, 33 km northeast of the city of Kozani. It is located near the artificial lake of Polyfyto. A local road connects it with the GR-3/E65 between Larissa and Kozani. It is located southwest of Veria, north-northwest of Servia and Larissa, east-northeast of Grevena and south-southeast of Kozani.

Surrounded by forests, it is located in the fertile valley of the Haliacmon river and produces fruit, mainly peaches. 10.6% of the area is cultivated.  Agricultural production is organised in two agricultural cooperatives.

History

The area has been continually occupied since the prehistoric times. For this reason, many fruitful archaeological digs have been made in the area, unearthing mainly prehistoric findings. Velventos contains also many late Byzantine and post-Byzantine monuments and temples, among them the 12th-century church of Saint Minas and the 14th-century church of Saint Paraskevi.

During the Turkish occupation of Greece, Velventos saw great cultural development. Architect Stamatios Kleanthis was born here.

Velventos became part of Greece during the Balkan Wars.

Facilities
Velventos has a school, church, a lyceum (middle school), a gymnasium (secondary school), banks, a post office, and a square.

A well organized athletic stadium for several indoor and outdoor sport activities is located at the exit of the town. There are 2 Athletic Clubs, A.C. Velventos who has Soccer, Basketball and Volleyball as their main sport activities and A.C. Taekwondo Velventos with Taekwondo and Kick Boxing.

Notable people

Numerous scholars and famous researchers were born in this area, e.g.:

 Stamatios Kleanthis famous architect
 Eleni Psara (pioneer of optics engineering)
 Markos Palamidis, fighter during the Macedonian struggle

See also

List of settlements in the Kozani regional unit

References

External links 
 Municipality of Velvento (Greek)
Velventos (town) on GTP Travel Pages
Velventos (municipality) on GTP Travel Pages
Area given by West Macedonia Development Company

Municipalities of Western Macedonia
Populated places in Kozani (regional unit)